Qaragol (also Romanized as Qarāgol; also known as Qarah Āghol and Qarehqol) is a village in Anguran Rural District, Anguran District, Mahneshan County, Zanjan Province, Iran. At the 2006 census, its population was 95, in 19 families.

References 

Populated places in Mahneshan County